Patay may refer to:

People
 Franz Patay (born 1961), Austrian arts administrator
 Marius Patay {fr, de}, French inventor
 Pál Patay {de, hu, ia}, Hungarian archeologist
 Vilmos Patay (born 1953), Hungarian politician

Places
 
 Patay, Loiret, France

Other
 Battle of Patay